Events from the year 1797 in the United States.

Incumbents

Federal Government 
 President: George Washington (no political party-Virginia) (until March 4), John Adams (F-Massachusetts) (starting March 4)
 Vice President: John Adams (F-Massachusetts) (until March 4), Thomas Jefferson (DR-Virginia) (starting March 4)
Chief Justice: Oliver Ellsworth (Connecticut)
 Speaker of the House of Representatives: Jonathan Dayton (F-New Jersey)
 Congress: 4th (until March 4), 5th (starting March 4)

Events

 January 3 – The Treaty of Tripoli (a peace treaty between the United States and Tripoli) is signed at Algiers (see also 1796 in the United States).
 February 22 – The last invasion of Britain: An American colonel named William Tate leads French forces in a landing near Fishguard in Wales.
 March 4 – John Adams is sworn in as the second President of the United States, and Thomas Jefferson is sworn in as Vice President of the United States.
 April 17 – Sir Ralph Abercromby unsuccessfully invades San Juan, Puerto Rico in what will be one of the largest British attacks on Spanish territories in the western hemisphere, and one of the worst defeats of the English navy for years to come.
 May 10 – The first ship of the United States Navy, the frigate , is commissioned.
 October 21 – In Boston Harbor, the 44-gun United States Navy frigate  is launched to fight Barbary pirates off the coast of Tripoli.

Undated
 The XYZ Affair inflames tensions between France and the United States.

Ongoing
 Panic of 1796–1797 (1796–1797)
 XYZ Affair (1797-1798)

Births
 January 1
 Robert Crittenden, attorney and politician (d. 1834)  
 William Greene, lieutenant governor of the state of Rhode Island (d. 1883)  
 January 2 – Eliakim Littell, editor (d. 1870) 
 January 4 – John Hampden Pleasants, journalist and businessman (d. 1846) 
 January 5 – Timothy Gilbert, piano manufacturer (d. 1865) 
 January 6 – James Kingsley, attorney and mayor of Ann Arbor (1855–1856) (d. 1878)
 January 8 – David Barker Jr., politician, member of the United States House of Representatives (d. 1834)  
 January 10
 Hazen Aldrich, early leader in the Latter Day Saint movement (d. 1873) 
 Eugenio Kincaid, Baptist missionary to Burma (d. 1883)
 January 12 – George Evans, politician from Maine (d. 1867)  
 January 16 – Richard Barnes Mason, career officer in the United States Army, governor of California (d. 1850) 
 January 28 – Obadiah Bush, prospector and businessman (d. 1851) 
 January 30
 John Fairfield, politician from Maine (d. 1847) 
 Edwin Vose Sumner, career United States Army officer who became a Union Army general during the American Civil War (d. 1863) 
 February 5 – F. W. P. Greenwood, Unitarian minister of King's Chapel in Boston (d. 1843)  
 February 7 – François Chouteau, pioneer fur trader (d. 1838)
 February 11 – John Allen Wakefield, historian and politician (d. 1873)
 February 18 – Elias Florence, member of the United States House of Representatives (d. 1880) 
 John Davis Pierce, Congregationalist minister (d. 1882) 
 February 28 
John Henderson, United States Senator from Mississippi from 1839 till 1845 (died 1857)
 George Keats, businessman and civic leader in Louisville, Kentucky (d. 1841)
 February 14 – John Capron, infantry officer (died 1878)
 March 2 – Stephen Olin, educator and minister (died 1851)
 March 4
 Jasper Ewing Brady, Whig member of the United States House of Representatives (died 1871)
 Charles Jackson, 18th Governor of Rhode Island (1845-1846) (died 1876)
 March 18 – James Wilson II, United States Representative from New Hampshire (died 1881)
 March 21 – William K. Clowney, United States Representative from South Carolina (died 1851)
 March 22 – Pierre Bossier, Louisiana soldier and state senator (d. 1844)
 May 24 – James Morehead, United States Senator from Kentucky from 1841 to 1847. (died 1854)
 June 13 – Richard Ely Selden, American politician and author (died 1868)
 June 14
 John Beard, politician (d. 1876)
 Calvin Pollard, New York City architect (d. 1850)
 June 21
 William Jessup, Pennsylvania judge and father of the missionary Henry Harris Jessup (d. 1868)
 Benson Leavitt, Boston businessman (d. 1869)
 June 27 – Andrew W. Loomis, United States Representative from Ohio (died 1873)

Deaths
 November 26 – Andrew Adams, signatory of the Articles of Confederation (born 1736)

See also
Timeline of United States history (1790–1819)

Further reading
 
 Notes of Travel of William Henry, John Heckewelder, John Rothrock, and Christian Clewell, to Gnadenhuetten on the Muskingum, in the Early Summer of 1797. The Pennsylvania Magazine of History and Biography, Vol. 10, No. 2 (July, 1886), pp. 125–157
 
 Herman R. Friis, Ralph E. Ehrenberg. Nicholas King and His Wharfing Plans of the City of Washington, 1797. Records of the Columbia Historical Society, Washington, D.C., Vol. 66/68, The 46th separately bound book (1966/1968), pp. 34–46.
 William K. Bottorff, Roy C. Flannagan, Frances Baylor Hill. The Diary of Frances Baylor Hill of "Hillsborough" King and Queen County Virginia (1797). Early American Literature Newsletter, Vol. 2, No. 3, (Winter, 1967), pp. 3–53.
 David J. Brandenburg, Millicent H. Brandenburg. The Duc De La Rochefoucauld-Liancourt's Visit to the Federal City in 1797: A New Translation. Records of the Columbia Historical Society, Washington, D.C., Vol. 49, The 49th separately bound book (1973/1974), pp. 35–60.
 
 Lee W. Formwalt. An English Immigrant Views American Society: Benjamin Henry Latrobe's Virginia Years, 1796-1798. The Virginia Magazine of History and Biography, Vol. 85, No. 4 (October, 1977), pp. 387–410.
 John L. Brittain and Henry Middleton Rutledge. Henry Middleton Rutledge to His Father, November 1, 1797. The South Carolina Historical Magazine, Vol. 83, No. 3 (July, 1982), pp. 235–240.
 Arthur Scherr. "Vox Populi" versus the Patriot President: Benjamin Franklin Bache's Philadelphia Aurora and John Adams (1797). Pennsylvania History, Vol. 62, No.4 (Fall 1995), pp. 503–531.

External links
 

 
1790s in the United States
United States
United States
Years of the 18th century in the United States